18th is an 'L' station on the CTA's Pink Line. It is located at 1710 West 18th Street in the Pilsen neighborhood of Chicago, Illinois. The station is decorated with colorful murals painted by local artists from Pilsen.

History

18th station opened on April 28, 1896, as part of the Metropolitan West Side Elevated Railroad's Douglas Park branch. From May 1991 until March 1993, the original station was demolished and rebuilt. On June 25, 2006, the 18th station, along with all other stations on the 54th/Cermak branch of the Blue Line, became part of the Pink Line. Rather than continuing east on the Blue Line through the Dearborn subway to O'Hare north of the Polk station, trains run north over a section of track on Paulina Avenue and then run on the same tracks as the Green Line west of the Ashland station before circling clockwise around the Loop and returning to 54th/Cermak via the same route.

In 2016, the Chicago Central Area Commission's proposed the construction of the Connector Transitway which would terminate at 18th.

In 2020, parts of the 1998 murals created by local artists were removed after they had been vandalised, after which the CTA has worked with the local community to restore the murals.

Bus connections
CTA
  18 16th/18th

References

External links 

18th station page at CTA official website
18th Street entrance from Google Maps Street View

CTA Pink Line stations
Railway stations in the United States opened in 1896
Railway stations in Chicago
Lower West Side, Chicago